The Memphis Blues were a Minor League Baseball team that played in Memphis, Tennessee, from 1968 to 1976. They competed in the Double-A Texas League from 1968 to 1973 as an affiliate of the New York Mets. Memphis transferred to the Triple-A International League in 1974, where they were affiliated with the Montreal Expos from 1974 to 1975 and Houston Astros in 1976. Their home games were played at Blues Stadium

Over the course of their nine-year run, Memphis played in 1,239 regular season games and compiled a win–loss record of 644–595. The Blues reached the postseason on five occasions, winning four division titles, and two Texas League championships. They won their league titles in 1969 and 1973 as affiliates of the New York Mets. The team had an overall postseason record of 9–12.

History

Prior professional baseball in Memphis
The first professional baseball team in Memphis was the Memphis Reds of the League Alliance in 1877. A different Reds team was created as a charter member of the original Southern League in 1885. The city's Southern League team was known as the Grays in 1886 and 1888, the Browns in 1887, simply Memphis in 1889, the Giants in 1892 and 1894, the Fever Germs in 1893, and the Lambs/Giants in 1895.

The city's longest-operating baseball team, first known as Memphis Egyptians, was formed in 1901 as a charter member of the Southern Association. From 1909 to 1911, this club was called the Turtles before receiving its best-known moniker, the Chickasaws, often shortened to Chicks, in 1912. The original Chicks remained in the league through 1960, winning eight pennants, one playoff championship, and one Dixie Series title. Russwood Park, their home ballpark, was destroyed by fire in April 1960. With the cost of building a new facility too high, the team dropped out of the league after the 1960 season.

Texas League (1968–1973)
After a seven-year span with no professional team, the city became host to the Memphis Blues, a Double-A club of the Texas League, in 1968. The team played at Blues Stadium, a converted American Legion field which opened in 1963 and was located at the former Mid-South Fairgrounds. They were affiliated with the New York Mets. On April 16, the Blues won their inaugural season opener against the Arkansas Travelers, 10–2. On July 21, Steve Renko pitched a seven-inning no-hitter against the Albuquerque Dodgers in the second game of a doubleheader in Memphis. The Blues finished the season with a 67–69 record, placing third in the Eastern Division and missing the championship playoffs for which only division winners qualified.

On April 20, 1969, Les Rohr pitched an 8–0 no-hitter against the San Antonio Missions in the second game of a seven-inning doubleheader at Blues Stadium. The 1969 Blues improved over their previous record, ending their sophomore season with a 66–65 record and winning the Eastern Division title. In the best-of-five finals, Memphis defeated the Amarillo Giants, 3–0, to win the 1969 Texas League championship. Manager Roy McMillan won the Texas League Manager of the Year Award. Memphis repeated as the Eastern Division champions in 1970 with a first-place 69–67 record, but they lost the finals to Albuquerque, 3–1.

In 1971, the Texas League joined forces with the Southern League to form the Dixie Association. Under the interleague partnership, the two leagues played an interlocking schedule with individual league champions determined at the end of the season, but Memphis missed the playoffs with a second-place finish in its Central Division. On June 25, Tommy Moore no-hit Arkansas, 4–0, on the road in the second seven-inning game of a doubleheader. A second-place finish in 1972 again kept the Blues from the postseason.

Memphis won the Eastern Division in 1973 with a 77–61 record. The Blues then won a second Texas League championship by defeating the San Antonio Brewers, 3–2, in the finals. Through six seasons in the Texas League as a Mets affiliate, Memphis accumulated a record of 423–396.

International League (1974–1976)

The Blues were replaced by a Triple-A International League (IL) team in 1974. The Triple-A Blues carried on the history of the Double-A team preceding it.

Owner Bernard Kraus sold the Double-A Texas League team for US$25,000 to businessman Cal Rockefeller, who moved the team to Victoria, Texas, where they became the Victoria Toros.

Affiliated with the Montreal Expos, Memphis finished its first season in the International League with an 87–55 record, winning the Southern Division title.	They were eliminated, however, in the semifinals by the Rochester Red Wings, 4–2. Manager Karl Kuehl was selected for the IL Manager of the Year Award. The Blues missed the playoffs with a sub-.500 record in 1975. After two seasons with the Expos, the Blues' record was 152–130. Their all-time eight-year record stood at 575–526.

Memphis became the Triple-A affiliate of the Houston Astros in 1976. They qualified for the postseason with a top-four finish at an even 69–69, but they were swept out of the semifinals with a 3–0 series loss to the Syracuse Chiefs. Their final game was a 5–4 loss in Memphis. After nine seasons, the Blues' all-time record was 644–595.

The International League revoked Memphis' franchise at a November 8, 1976, meeting of the league's directors because the owner was unable to pay $22,000 owed for league dues plus lodging and transportation bills due to different cities in the league. An audit revealed the team to be nearly $340,000 in debt. The franchise was switched to Charleston, West Virginia, in 1977 as the Charleston Charlies. Memphis businessman Avron Fogelman attempted to acquire a Texas League franchise to replace the Blues, but was unsuccessful. He later secured an expansion team in the Double-A Southern League, which began play in 1978 as the Memphis Chicks.

Season-by-season results

References

External links
 Statistics from Baseball-Reference

1968 establishments in Tennessee
1976 disestablishments in Tennessee
Baseball teams established in 1968
Baseball teams disestablished in 1976
Defunct baseball teams in Tennessee
Defunct International League teams
Defunct Texas League teams
Houston Astros minor league affiliates
Montreal Expos minor league affiliates
New York Mets minor league affiliates
Professional baseball teams in Tennessee
B